Marie de Hennezel (Marie Gaultier de la Ferrière; born August 5, 1946) is a French psychologist, psychotherapist and writer. She is known for her commitment to improving conditions at the end of life. Her books, her two reports to the government, and her speeches on the subject have contributed to the evolution of the image of aging and old age in society.

Biography
Marie Gaultier de la Ferrière was born in Lyon, August 5, 1946. She is an alumnus of the educational institution of Maison d'éducation de la Légion d'honneur, 
is a graduate of the Institute of Intercultural Management and Communication (ISIT) (1966), and holds a Master's degree in English from the Sorbonne Nouvelle University Paris III.

After teaching English, she returned to school to become a clinical psychologist. She obtained a Diploma of Higher Specialized Studies (DESS) in clinical psychology at Paris-Sorbonne University and then a Master of Advanced Studies in psychoanalysis at Paris Diderot University in 1975. From 1975 to 1984, she worked as a clinical psychologist in several social welfare offices and at the Family Planning, at the time of the Veil Act. Then from 1984 to 1986, she worked as a clinical psychologist in a psychiatric department at the Villejuif Regional Hospital.

Through her brother Jacques de la Ferrière, then chief of protocol at the Élysée Palace, she met President François Mitterrand in November 1984. This was followed by meetings with Mitterrand during the last twelve years of his life until January 1996. On the 20th anniversary of his death, Hennezel published her book,  (Believing in the Forces of the Spirit), which outlines his little-known inner personality.

In 1987, she joined the first palliative care unit created in France, at the International Hospital of the University of Paris, by Mitterrand. From 1992, she divided her time between this unit and an HIV/AIDS care unit at the Hôpital Notre-Dame-du-Bon-Secours. She recounts this experience with people at the end of their lives in a book with a preface by Mitterrand, published by Robert Laffont (1995) and translated into some twenty languages.

From 1996 to 2002, she attended conference where she passed on the experience of accompaniment acquired with people at the end of life, and training courses for health professionals.

In 2002, Jean-François Mattei, Minister of Health, the Family and the Handicapped, entrusted Hennezel to research and report on the end of life. This report  (End of life, the duty to accompany) (October 2003) inspired the parliamentary mission on the accompaniment of the end of life, and the law of April 22, 2005,  (Rights of the sick and the end of life) is an extension of it.

In January 2005, Hennezel was entrusted by Philippe Douste-Blazy, Minister of Health, to disseminate information about palliative culture. She resigned from this committee in 2012, following a disagreement concerning the methodology of the observatory.

Hennezel runs seminars on "the art of aging well" for [udiens, the mutual insurance company and pension fund for the entertainment, audio-visual and press professions. She is a member of the honorary committee of the collective Plus digne la vie, and is also a director and member of the scientific committee of the Korian Foundation.

Awards and honours
 Knight, Legion of Honour, 1998.
 Officer, Ordre national du Mérite, 2003
 Doctor honoris causa, Université de Namur, 2007

Selected works
 L'Amour ultime : l'accompagnement des mourants, 1991
 La mort intime : ceux qui vont mourir nous apprennent à vivre, 1995
 L'art de mourir : traditions religieuses et spiritualité humaniste face à la mort aujourd'hui, 1997
 Nous ne nous sommes pas dit au revoir : la dimension humaine du débat sur l'euthanasie, 2000 
 Le souci de l'autre, 2004
 Fin de vie le devoir d'accompagnement : rapport au ministre de la Santé, octobre 2003, 2004
 Propositions pour une vie digne jusqu'au bout, 2004
 Mourir les yeux ouverts, 2005 
 The art of growing old : aging with grace, 2007
 Une vie pour se mettre au monde, 2010
 Qu'allons nous faire de vous?, 2011
 Seize the day : how the dying teach us to live, 2012
 Nous voulons tous mourir dans la dignité, 2013 
 A Frenchwoman's guide to sex after sixty, 2017

Notes

References

1946 births
Living people
French women psychologists
20th-century French psychologists
21st-century psychologists
French psychotherapists
People from Lyon
Sorbonne Nouvelle University Paris 3 alumni